Keystone is a former unincorporated community (ghost town) in Dickey County, North Dakota, United States.

History 
Keystone was originally built up by settlers from Pennsylvania, and the name taken from that state's nickname, the Keystone State.

References 

Geography of Dickey County, North Dakota
Ghost towns in North Dakota